Guillén Peraza de Ayala y Rojas (1488-1565) was a Spanish nobleman and ruler of La Gomera and El Hierro in the Canary Islands.

Biography

Guillén Peraza was born in 1488 in Seville as a member of the Peraza family that was influential in the early history and conquest of the Canary Islands.

His father was Hernán Peraza the Younger, Lord of La Gomera, El Hierro, Fuerteventura, and Lanzarote. His mother was Beatriz de Bobadilla y Ulloa of the prominent Bobadilla family.

Through his high-level family contacts, he was elevated from the title of territorial lord to the first Count of La Gomera in 1515 by Queen Joanna and Emperor Carlos V. He also retained the title of Lord of El Hierro.

Personal life

Peraza married Beatriz Fernández de Saavedra in 1514 and the couple had one child together, a daughter, Catalina Peraza de Ayala y Saavedra the same year. He had a son Baltazar who died in Peru in 1556.

He died in June 1565 in Madrid at the age of 77.

See also
 Conquest of the Canary Islands
 History of the Canary Islands

References

15th-century births
1488 births
1565 deaths
People from Seville
14th-century Castilians
Counts of Spain